Aeroframe Services, LLC was a privately owned aviation maintenance service company specializing in MRO for large commercial transport aircraft including Airbus jetliners.  Aeroframe Services was formed on August 1, 2005, when Roger Porter acquired EADS Aeroframe Services with EADS being the parent company of Airbus.  Aeroframe Services was headquartered in Lake Charles, Louisiana at Chennault International Airport.  Aeroframe Services has now been replaced at the Chennault airport by AAR Corporation.

Companies based in Louisiana
Lake Charles, Louisiana